Ntege Kiyimba was Kabaka (King) of the Kingdom of Buganda. He reigned from 1464 to 1484. He was the 6th Kabaka of Buganda.

Claim to the throne

He was the sixth son of Kabaka Kiggala Mukaabya. His mother was Nabukalu, of the Lugave clan, the first wife of Kabaka Kiggala Mukaabya. He ascended the throne around 1464, when his father abdicated.

Married life

He had two wives:

Bamuggya, daughter of Kisuule, of the Njaza clan
Gwojjanjaba, daughter of Gunju, of the Butiko clan.

Death
He died at Mpummudde and was initially buried at Lukwangu, Busiro. He was succeeded on the throne by his father, around 1484. He is buried at Sentema, Busiro, in modern-day Wakiso District.

Succession table

See also
Kabaka of Buganda

References

External links
List of the Kings of Buganda

Kabakas of Buganda
15th-century monarchs in Africa